The Northern Territory (NT) Evidence of age card is a voluntary identity photo card available to residents of NT, Australia over the age of 18.  The purpose of the card is to access age restricted services especially for those without a drivers licence.

References

Identity documents of Australia